Donald Tywon Lee (born  August 31, 1980) is a former American football tight end in the National Football League (NFL). He played college football for the Mississippi State Bulldogs. He was drafted by the Miami Dolphins in the fifth round of the 2003 NFL Draft and spent two seasons with the team. He also played for the Green Bay Packers from 2005 to 2010 and the Cincinnati Bengals from 2011 to 2012. With Green Bay, he won Super Bowl XLV against the Pittsburgh Steelers.

Early years
Lee attended Maben High School in Mississippi, where he lettered in football, track, and basketball.

College career
Before his professional career, Lee was a four-year letterman at Mississippi State from 1999 to 2002.

Professional career

Miami Dolphins
Lee was drafted by the Miami Dolphins in the fifth round, 156th overall in the 2003 NFL Draft. He went on to play two years for the Dolphins.

Green Bay Packers
In the 2005 NFL season, Lee was signed by the Green Bay Packers in free agency.

After the injury of Bubba Franks, Lee gained more playing time. He finished the season fourth in receiving (1st among tight ends) for the Packers.

In November 2007, Lee signed a four-year contract extension with the Packers for $12 million. On November 18, 2007, Lee had the first multi-touchdown game of his career as he caught two touchdown passes from Brett Favre in a 31–17 victory over the Carolina Panthers. Lee also found the end zone in Favre's record setting day for "most passing yards" on December 16, 2007 vs. the St. Louis Rams. Lee finished the 2007 season with 48 receptions for 575 yards and six touchdowns. He also caught Favre's final touchdown pass as a Packer during the NFC Championship Game against the New York Giants on January 20, 2008.

On March 2, 2011, Lee was released by the Packers.

Philadelphia Eagles
On July 29, 2011, Lee was signed to a one-year contract with the Philadelphia Eagles. He was released during final roster cuts on September 3.

Cincinnati Bengals
Lee was signed by the Cincinnati Bengals on September 14, 2011.
Lee was released by the Bengals on September 27, 2012.

Regular season statistics

Post-season statistics

Personal life
Lee is currently dating former WNBA player Anriel Howard better known as current WWE NXT Superstar Lash Legend. He also has two children, Donsha and Don Lee Jr.

References

External links
 Philadelphia Eagles bio
 Green Bay Packers bio

1980 births
Living people
Players of American football from Mississippi
American football tight ends
Mississippi State Bulldogs football players
Green Bay Packers players
Miami Dolphins players
Philadelphia Eagles players
Cincinnati Bengals players
People from Maben, Mississippi